Dinebra is a genus of Asian, African, and Pacific Island plants in the grass family.

 Species
 Dinebra haareri (Stapf & C.E.Hubb.) P.M.Peterson & N.Snow - Kenya, Tanzania
 Dinebra marquisensis (F.Br.) P.M.Peterson & N.Snow - Marquesas Islands in French Polynesia
 Dinebra perrieri (A.Camus) Bosser - Madagascar
 Dinebra polycarpha S.M.Phillips - Kenya, Tanzania, Uganda, Ethiopia
 Dinebra retroflexa (Vahl) Panz. - Africa + Asia from South Africa to Senegal + Egypt + Andaman Islands; naturalized in St. Helena, Mauritius, Malaysia, Queensland, Maryland, North Carolina
 Dinebra somalensis (Stapf) P.M.Peterson & N.Snow - Kenya, Tanzania, Sudan, South Sudan, Ethiopia, Djibouti, Somalia, Saudi Arabia

 formerly included
see Bouteloua Brachypodium Cutandia Desmostachya Enteropogon Heteranthoecia Leptochloa Tripogon Wangenheimia

References

Chloridoideae
Poaceae genera
Grasses of Africa
Grasses of Asia
Grasses of Europe